The Erlanger Health System (often referred to as Erlanger Hospital or Erlanger), incorporated as the Chattanooga-Hamilton County Hospital Authority, a non-profit, public benefit corporation registered in the State of Tennessee, is a system of hospitals, physicians, and medical services based in Chattanooga, Tennessee. The system provides critical care services  to patients within a  radius through six Life Force air ambulance helicopters, which are equipped to perform in-flight surgical procedures and transfusions.

Academic affiliation 
Erlanger is the primary teaching hospital for the University of Tennessee Health Science Center's College of Medicine Chattanooga. UTHSC College of Medicine Chattanooga trains physicians enrolled annually in the medical college's residency and fellowship programs. Enrollment for the 2020–2021 academic year included 193 residents and fellows. Medical students from the University of Tennessee Health Science Center in Memphis may also elect a variety of clinical rotations at Erlanger. Nursing students, paramedic students, and many other allied health students also train at Erlanger in conjunction with the University of Tennessee at Chattanooga (UTC), Chattanooga State Technical Community College (CSTCC), and other regional colleges.

Level I Trauma Center 
Erlanger Baroness Hospital is a Level I trauma center and meets state and national criteria to serve as a comprehensive regional resource for adult and pediatric patients with major traumatic injuries. Erlanger is one of six Level 1 trauma centers in Tennessee.

Erlanger is an essential safety net hospital for the region, providing care for under served and uninsured populations. The system provided $85 million in uncompensated care during fiscal year 2014–2015.

Hospitals, facilities, and practices 
 Erlanger Baroness Hospital is the health system's medical, academic, and administrative headquarters, located just east of downtown Chattanooga. Baroness Hospital includes a Level I trauma center, major in-patient and surgical departments, and ambulatory care center.
 Children's Hospital at Erlanger is a Comprehensive Regional Pediatric Center (CRPC). It includes 21 pediatric subspecialties, a pediatric trauma center, emergency department, and Level IIII Neonatal Intensive Care Unit. The facility is located next to Erlanger Baroness Hospital.
 Erlanger East Hospital completed a $50 million expansion in 2016, including a 58-bed patient tower providing medical/surgical care, a six-bed intensive care unit (ICU), and cardiovascular interventional radiology lab. Other services include 24/7 emergency care and women's centers for breast health and obstetrics.
 Erlanger North Hospital is a community hospital serving the Signal Mountain, Red Bank, and North Chattanooga communities. It offers 24/7 emergency care, sports and family medicine practices, an inpatient seniors program, and a sleep disorders center accredited by the American Academy of Sleep Medicine.
 Erlanger Bledsoe Hospital is a community and safety net hospital in Pikeville, Tennessee, serving residents of a rural three-county area along the Cumberland Plateau and Sequatchie Valley. Services include 24/7 emergency care, family medicine practices, cardiac rehabilitation program, and a 25-bed inpatient unit.
 Erlanger Western Carolina Hospital (formerly Murphy Medical Center), based in Murphy, North Carolina, includes a 25-bed critical access hospital with emergency department as well as wound care, urgent care, and athletic/rehabilitation centers. The hospital provides inpatient and outpatient medical services for a seven-county region in western North Carolina, North Georgia, and East Tennessee.
Erlanger Behavioral Health Hospital is an 88-bed mental health facility providing access to psychiatric and addiction services. Established through a joint-venture with Acadia Healthcare, the hospital opened in June 2018.
The Southside and Dodson Avenue Community Health Centers are safety-net clinical care providers operating under comprehensive federal standards.
 Erlanger Sequatchie Valley in Dunlap, Tennessee, offers primary care and 24/7 emergency services, as well as weekly clinics for cardiology, orthopaedics, and women's health.
 Erlanger at Volkswagen Drive is a multi-use health and wellness center that includes a family practice, a fitness center, adult urgent care, and childcare facility.
 Erlanger Medical Group is the health system's physician practice consisting of more than 200 employed physicians in 56 locations. Physicians in this group also teach medical students through Erlanger's affiliation with UT College of Medicine.

Life Force Air Medical 

Erlanger's six Life Force helicopters enable the health system to reach critically injured or ill patients within a 150-mile radius of Chattanooga.

The aircraft are dispatched from six bases outside of Hamilton County: Calhoun and Blue Ridge in Georgia; Sparta, Winchester, and Cleveland in Tennessee; and Andrews in North Carolina. The helicopters then transport pediatric and adult patients to the most appropriate receiving hospital, usually Baroness Hospital.

Each aircraft is staffed by specialized flight nurses and paramedics, and are equipped to carry blood and perform life saving in-flight surgical procedures.

In fiscal year 2014–2015, Life Force transported 2,143 patients to and from Erlanger hospitals.

Life Force began operations at Erlanger in December 1988. In 2008, Med-Trans Corp., a Dallas-based air medical provider, began operating the aviation aspects of the program under a 10-year lease agreement.

Life Force uses Eurocopter EC-135 (now Airbus Helicopters H135) and Bell 407 helicopters.

Specialized Centers of Excellence 
As a tertiary hospital that receives primary and secondary referrals, Erlanger provides specialized medical care, research, and educational training in the following clinical centers of excellence:
 Neurosciences – This department includes the Southeast Regional Stroke Center at Erlanger, which is certified by the Joint Commission as a comprehensive program. At the 2015 International Stroke Conference, the program was recognized for clinical research supporting the efficacy of neurointerventional stroke care. Other sub-specialties include neurosurgery, neuromuscular medicine, sleep medicine, movement disorders, and epilepsy care.
Pediatrics - See Children's Hospital at Erlanger.

Trauma  – Erlanger Baroness Hospital is a Level I Trauma Center treating critically ill and traumatically injured patients in a 63-county service area. The hospital also serves as a tertiary care facility central to the area's Regional Trauma System covering Tennessee, Georgia, Alabama, and North Carolina.
Orthopaedics – In addition to treating patients, Erlanger's fellowship-trained orthopedic surgeons provide coverage for the system's Level I trauma center and serve as sports medicine doctors for professional, Olympic, and regional sports teams. Specializations include minimally-invasive, arthroscopic surgery, total and partial joint replacement, and lower-extremity deformity correction through the Erlanger Foot and Ankle Institute.
 Urology – This academic group treats general and pediatric urologic disorders as well as bladder, pelvic and men's health issues. The center also specializes in robotic, minimally-invasive techniques for treating cancers of the kidney, bladder, and prostate.
 Oncology – Accredited by the American College of Surgeons, Erlanger's oncology department provides multidisciplinary cancer treatment in which medical, radiation, and surgical oncologists review each case in weekly tumor board reviews. The program includes five-day, targeted radiation therapy for early-stage breast cancer and robotic-assisted radiation therapy.
 Cardiology – Erlanger's Heart and Lung Institute is a regional referral center for patients with complex cardiovascular conditions. Subspecialties include preventive cardiology, electrophysiology, heart failure, women's cardiology, vascular/structural heart disease, and advanced imaging.
 Emergency – Erlanger operates 24/7 emergency centers at each of its five hospitals as well as a free-standing emergency facility in Dunlap, TN. In 2015 and 2016, Erlanger was named “Best Emergency Room” in The Chattanooga Times-Free Press “Best of the Best” awards. That year the health system also established the $1.6 million Erlanger Regional Operations Center to provide medical support, dispatch, and control for emergency medical services across Southeast Tennessee.
 Primary Care – Erlanger operates 16 primary care and family medicine practices across the region. Services include acute care, chronic disease management, preventive care, and sports medicine.
 Women's Care and Childbirth – Erlanger Baroness Hospital is a tertiary level III care center for high-risk obstetrics, and also provides labor and delivery services for low-risk patients. Erlanger East Hospital offers single-room maternity care for vaginal deliveries, surgical facilities for C-sections, and a Level IIA special care nursery. Erlanger was the first health system in Tennessee to achieve “Baby Friendly” accreditation for best-practices in breastfeeding education. Erlanger East has been named “Best Place to Have a Baby” every year since 2008 in the “Best of the Best” people's-choice awards sponsored by the Chattanooga Times-Free Press.
Bariatrics - Erlanger's Metabolic and Bariatric Center is an accredited comprehensive center under the Metabolic and Bariatric Surgery Accreditation and Quality Improvement Program. Emphasizing education, support and lifelong weight loss, the center is staffed by bariatric surgeons, dietitian, life coach, nurses, and bariatric navigators.

History 

1889 – Baron Frédéric Emile d'Erlanger, a German financier with railroad holdings in Chattanooga, donates $5,000 ($ in  dollars) to establish the region's first permanent hospital.

1890 – Civic leaders work to raise the rest of the money to build the facility, and begin construction on a four-acre tract on Harrison Avenue, now East 3rd Street.

1891 – Community leaders hold a cornerstone ceremony to celebrate completion of the building's foundation. They decide to name the facility in honor of the Baron's Southern-born wife, Baroness Marguerite Mathilde Slidell d'Erlanger.

1899 – At a cost of $50,000 ($ in  dollars), Baroness Erlanger Hospital opens with 72 beds.

1957 – The two oldest portions of the hospital, the original west and central wings, are razed to make way for expanded in-patient and surgical facilities.

1958 – Pediatrician James Hicks Corey, Jr, MD, becomes Chief of Staff for Children's Hospital, a position he holds for 40 years.

1964 – Dr. Minnie Vance and Dr. Eleanor Stafford, two of the first female pediatricians in Chattanooga, open one of the first waiting rooms in the city and were at the forefront of promoting diversity within the hospital.

1965 – Dr. Hossein Massoud becomes medical director of Children's Hospital, a position he holds for 31 years, growing pediatric subspecialty programs which cover the spectrum of pediatric care.

1975 – Children's Hospital becomes a part of Erlanger and relocated to the downtown campus.

1976 – The region's first pediatric intensive care unit opens.

2007 – U.S. President George W. Bush tours Erlanger Baroness Hospital, where he is briefed on the latest advancements in stroke treatment and receives a hands-on demonstration of the da Vinci robotic surgical system. During a healthcare forum at the Chattanooga Convention Center, President Bush expresses admiration for Erlanger's commitment to cutting-edge care.

2014 – Erlanger announces plans for the largest expansion in its history. The six-phase, 20-year master facilities plan includes a $51 million expansion of Erlanger East Hospital, a  children's and women's ambulatory center, an  stroke and neurosciences center, a new Children's and Women's hospital, and a health sciences center to house the Chattanooga facilities of UT College of Medicine.

2016 – In a year marking the health system's 125 year of service to the region, Erlanger and Vanderbilt University Medical Center (VUMC) enter a strategic affiliation agreement creating a collaborative relationship between the two institutions. As part of the agreement, Erlanger also joined the Vanderbilt Health Affiliated Network, to facilitate greater care coordination, including population health and wellness initiatives. In Nov. of 2016, the health system completed a $50 million expansion of Erlanger East Hospital. That month Erlanger also launched a new Heart and Lung Institute, expanding the health system's cardiovascular team, capabilities, and facilities.

2017 – Community and health system officials break ground on a  pediatric outpatient center at Erlanger's downtown campus. The facility is phase one of plans for a new Children's Hospital at Erlanger.

2018 – On April 1, 2018, Erlanger assumed operation of Murphy Medical Center in Murphy, North Carolina, and soon renamed the facility Erlanger Western Carolina Hospital.  It is the health system's sixth hospital and its first outside of Tennessee. December 2018 marked the opening of a  pediatric outpatient facility, the Kennedy Outpatient Center, located at Erlanger's downtown campus. The facility is phase one of plans for a new Children's Hospital at Erlanger in Chattanooga.

Statistics 
In fiscal year 2019–2020, Erlanger had:

 514,896 outpatient visits
 39,002 adult inpatient admissions
 182,292 adult and pediatric emergency department visits
 30,767 adult surgeries performed

Accreditations, certifications, and awards 

Accreditations
 Accredited NAPBC Breast Center – Erlanger Center for Breast Health, by the American College of Surgeons 2018
 Accredited Hospital – Erlanger Health System; by DNV GL Healthcare: National Integrated Accreditation of Healthcare Organizations Hospital Accreditation Program, 2018-2021
 Level I Trauma Center – Erlanger Health System; by the State of Tennessee, 2015
 Certified Comprehensive Stroke Center – Erlanger Southeast Regional Stroke Center; by The Joint Commission, 2015
Accredited Comprehensive Cancer Program – Erlanger Health System; by the American College of Surgeons Commission on Cancer, 2015
Certified Center of Excellence for Primary Hip and Knee Replacement – The Joint Commission, 2019
 Accredited Comprehensive Bariatric Center – Erlanger Metabolic and Bariatric Surgery Program; by the Metabolic and Bariatric Surgery Accreditation and Quality Improvement Program, 2015
 Baby-Friendly Designation – Erlanger Baroness Hospital; Baby Friendly, USA, Inc., 2015
 Accredited in Mammography and Ultrasound Center – Erlanger Imaging Mammography Center, Erlanger North Breast Center and Erlanger East Imaging; by the American College of Radiology, 2014/2015
 Accredited Clinical Hyperbaric Medicine Facility – Erlanger Wound Care & Hyperbaric Medicine Center; Undersea and Hyperbaric Medical Society, 2015
 Accredited Critical Care Air Transport Service – Erlanger Life Force Air Medical; Commission on Accreditation of Medical Transportation System, 2015

Awards
 Silver Plus "Get With The Guidelines" for Stroke – Erlanger Health System; from The Joint Commission, 2014
 Gold-level Certified Safe Sleep Champion – Erlanger Baroness and East Hospitals; from the Cribs for Kids® National Infant Safe Sleep Initiative, 2015
 Service of the Year Award for outstanding emergency medical services – Erlanger Life Force air medical program; from the Southeastern EMS Director's Association, 2015

References 

Teaching hospitals in Tennessee
Buildings and structures in Chattanooga, Tennessee
University of Tennessee at Chattanooga
Hospitals established in 1889
1889 establishments in Tennessee